Brazilian jiu-jitsu weight classes are weight classes that pertain to the sport of Brazilian jiu-jitsu (BJJ) and vary according to the organisations.

IBJJF weight classes 
The International Brazilian Jiu-Jitsu Federation (IBJJF) is the most prestigious BJJ organisation in the world, it oversees the biggest events in the sport such as the World Jiu-Jitsu Championship, the European Championship, the Asian Open Championship, the Pan-American Championship and the Brazilian Nationals. Rooster is the equivalent to Bantamweight in other combat sports.

ADCC weight classes 
Abu Dhabi Combat Club (ADCC) is the largest no gi submission grappling organisation in the world.

UAEJJF weight classes 
The largest events organised by the UAEJJF (United Arab Emirates Jiu-Jitsu Federation) are the Abu Dhabi World Professional Jiu-Jitsu Championship and the Abu Dhabi Grand Slam Jiu-Jitsu World Tour.

See also 

 IBJJF
 Abu Dhabi Combat Club Submission Wrestling World Championship
 Boxing Weight Class
 Kickboxing weight classes
 Mixed martial arts weight classes
 Professional wrestling weight classes
 Wrestling weight classes

Notes

References

Sources

External links 
 Official IBJFF 2021 Gi Weight Chart
 Official IBJFF 2021 No Gi Weight Chart
Jiu Jitsu Super Feather Weight Division

Brazilian jiu-jitsu
Weight classes